Saint-Flour-l'Étang (before 2020: Saint-Flour; Auvergnat: Sant Flor) is a commune in the Puy-de-Dôme department in Auvergne-Rhône-Alpes in central France.

See also
 Communes of the Puy-de-Dôme department

References

Saintflourletang